The  San Diego Chargers season was the franchise's 12th season in the National Football League (NFL) and its 22nd overall. The team failed to improve on their 11–5 record from 1980 and finished 10-6. In the playoffs, they beat the Dolphins in a game known as the Epic in Miami and lost to the Bengals in a game known as the Freezer Bowl.

1981 was the second straight season in which the Chargers reached the AFC Championship Game, as well as their second consecutive loss.

During this season, the Chargers lost two key players by way of trade. Before Week 3, wide receiver John Jefferson was dealt to the Green Bay Packers, while defensive end Fred Dean would be dealt to the eventual Super Bowl champion San Francisco 49ers by Week 5. The Chargers brought in Wes Chandler from New Orleans to replace Jefferson - after a slow start, he finished with 857 yards from 12 games (he had 1,142 yards on the season, counting his four games with the Saints). The other starting wideout was Charlie Joiner, who had one of his best seasons at age 34, gaining a career-high 1,188 yards and matching his career-best with 7 touchdowns. Rounding out the trio of receiving stars, tight end Kellen Winslow led the league in receptions for the second consecutive year, finishing with 88 catches for 1,075 yards and 10 touchdowns.

Quarterback Dan Fouts broke the NFL record for passing yardage for the third consecutive season, averaging 300 yards per game for the first time as he totalled 4,802. His touchdown-to-interception ratio was the best of his career, at 33 to 17. He was helped in this by a strong offensive line, anchored by veterans Russ Washington and Doug Wilkerson, which conceded only 19 sacks from 16 games, their best performance through Fouts' 15 years with the club. Running back Chuck Muncie enjoyed his best season, running for 1,144 yards and 19 touchdowns, tying the then-NFL season record for rushing touchdowns. With rookie James Brooks and John Cappelletti also contributing, San Diego rushed for over 2,000 yards for the only time during the pass-focussed Don Coryell's tenure.

While the offense was soaring to new heights, the defense collapsed in Dean's absence, becoming among the league's worst. They continued to be tough against the run, but with veteran safety Glen Edwards absent with injury through the first half of the season, they dropped to dead last against the pass - the 4,311 yards they conceded were a new NFL record. On the plus side, they did manage an above-average 23 interceptions, with Willie Buchanon snagging a team-leading 5. San Diego's sack count declined somewhat from 60 to 47, tied for third-best in the NFL. New starter John Woodcock tied with Gary Johnson as team-leaders, each managing 9.5 sacks.

On special teams, James Brooks put in a strong performance: his 13.2 yards per punt return was 2nd best in the league; with 23.7 yards per kickoff return, he ranked seventh. Rolf Benirschke made 19 of 26 field goals, including two late game-winners.

The season was chronicled on September 18, 2008 for America's Game: The Missing Rings, as one of the five greatest NFL teams to never win the Super Bowl.

1981 NFL Draft

Personnel

Staff

Roster

Regular season

Schedule

Note: Intra-division opponents are in bold text.

Game summaries

Week 1: at Cleveland Browns 

The Chargers opened their season by blowing out Cleveland on Monday night. Despite John Jefferson's holdout, the offense piled up 535 total yards, committing no turnovers, sustaining no sacks, and only punting twice. Rookie James Brooks rushed for the opener 4:10 into the game, and San Diego led the rest of the way, with Chuck Muncie adding another touchdown on the ground before halftime. In the second half, Charlie Joiner had receptions of 51 and 57 yards, and Brooks, Hank Bauer and Ron Smith all caught touchdowns from Dan Fouts. It was Bauer's 20th and final Charger touchdown.

Fouts completed 19 of 25 for 330 yards, 3 touchdowns and no interceptions. Joiner caught 6 passes for 191 yards, the most single-game yards he had as a Charger. Muncie rushed 24 times for 161 yards and a touchdown - with 23 receiving yards, it was the most yards he gained in any game through his career. Cleveland QB Brian Sipe put up 375 yards through the air, but was intercepted by Bob Gregor and Mike Williams as the Browns chased the game.

Week 2: vs. Detroit Lions 

A back-and-forth final quarter saw San Diego survive with a goalline interception. As in their opener, they scored on their first possession, Joiner's 40-yard reception, setting up Muncie to score two plays later. Detroit responded with 13 unanswered points, capitalising on a pair of Charger turnovers, and led by six midway through the 3rd quarter. San Diego responded with a 9-play, 81-yard drive, featuring a 49-yard catch by Joiner and finishing with Winslow's first touchdown of the season.

Detroit scored a touchdown on the first play of the 4th quarter, then forced a punt and drove back into Charger territory. However, Leroy Jones then recovered a fumble, Fouts hit Dwight Scales for 44 yards on the next play, and Muncie scored two plays after that. The Lions then pulled off a fake punt, before eventually settling for a field goal and a 23-21 lead. Back came the Chargers, converting a couple of third downs before John Cappelletti scored from two yards out with 56 seconds left. Lions QB Gary Danielson was sacked by Jones on the ensuing drive, but came back with three straight completions to reach the Charger eight-yard line. From there, he was intercepted by Frank Duncan with a single second on the clock.

Jones had two of the Chargers' three sacks on the day. Fouts was 18 of 25 for 316 yards, a touchdown and an interception. Joiner continued to shoulder the receiving burden in Jefferson's absence, catching 7 passes for 166 yards.

Week 3: at Kansas City Chiefs 

Despite an 8-3 advantage in takeaways, San Diego had to withstand a fierce rally before holding off the Chiefs. Kansas City scored on the game's opening drive, but touchdown receptions by Winslow and Brooks on consecutive drives had San Diego up 14-7 after a quarter. They extended their lead by going 84 yards in 8 plays, with Muncie scoring from the one; Linden King then intercepted Chief QB Bill Kenney, and Fouts found rookie tight end Eric Sievers in the end zone a play later: 28-7. Kenney then covered 76 yards in five straight completions to begin the Kansas City comeback, and Fouts was intercepted in Chief territory shortly before halftime.

In the 3rd quarter, Kansas City turned an interception into a further seven points. On the next drive, Muncie had a 30-yard run, a 32-yard reception and a 3-yard touchdown run. The Chiefs responded with an 80-yard touchdown drive, reducing the lead to 35-28. They reached midfield on their next possession, but Bob Gregor intercepted a tipped pass to stop the threat. Four plays later, the Chiefs pressured punter George Roberts into running; he was stopped well short of a first down, and Kansas City capitalised with a field goal.

Trailing by four, the Chiefs moved the ball close to midfield on their next drive, but Willie Buchanon recovered a fumbled pitch. The Chargers were forced to punt, but their defensive line then made the decisive play: Louie Kelcher deflected a Kenney pass, Leroy Jones intercepted the ball and flipped it to Gary Johnson for a touchdown with 1:53 to play.

Buchanon had two interceptions and a fumble recovery. Muncie had 93 yards on the ground (with two touchdowns) and 85 through the air.

Week 4: at Denver Broncos 

San Diego flirted with an improbable comeback before subsiding to their first defeat of the season. Craig Morton, who posted a perfect passer rating on the day, threw touchdowns on four successive first half drives, the longest covering 93 yards, while the Chargers committed three turnovers and failed to score. When the Broncos added a fifth touchdown on their first possession of the third quarter, it was 35-0.

Dan Fouts found Ron Smith for a 39-yard touchdown five plays later, and the Chargers began to chip away at the lead. With Denver having switched to their backup quarterback, they gained only one first down on their next two drives, while San Diego added a 52-yard Benirschke field goal and John Cappelletti's short touchdown run. Buchanon recovered a fumble on the next play, and Fouts soon found Winslow for another score: that made it 35-24, with 11:14 still on the clock.

Morton returned to the game, and soon had Denver poised to clinch victory, with a 1st and goal at the 4. Kelcher then forced a fumble, which Buchanon recovered. Fouts was soon intercepted, but Wyatt Henderson forced yet another fumble, and Buchanon made his third recovery in a span of 6:27. Starting at their own 15, San Diego gained one first down before Cappelletti added his name to the list of fumblers, with Denver recovering and finally scoring the clinching touchdown seven plays later.

Kellen Winslow had 10 receptions, for 106 yards and a touchdown.

Week 5: vs. Seattle Seahawks 

The Chargers overcame an early deficit to beat Seattle with something to spare. Following a scoreless 1st quarter, the Seahawks went ahead through Steve Largent's touchdown reception. San Diego responded quickly, Cappelletti going through the middle for 30 yards on the next play to spark a field goal drive. Their next drive went 83 yards in 11 plays, ending with Winslow's go-ahead touchdown.

In the 3rd quarter, Joiner's 12-yard reception capped a 12-play, 78-yard drive. Fouts fumbled shortly afterwards setting up the Seahawks in the red zone, but the Charger line held firm on a 4th and goal from the one yard line. Seattle did manage a field goal early in the 4th quarter, but San Diego responded with a 13-play, 80-yard drive, Joiner scoring the clinching touchdown with 3:54 on the clock.

Fouts completed 30 of 41 for 302 yards, with 3 touchdowns and no interceptions. Muncie was absent, but Cappelletti filled in with 85 yards rushing and 28 receiving. John Jefferson's replacement Wes Chandler had a quiet debut, with 5 receptions for 37 yards.

Week 6: vs. Minnesota Vikings 

A thriller with many twists and turns saw San Diego out-passed and beaten in the final seconds. Vikings' QB Tommy Kramer was intercepted twice in the 1st quarter - one pick, by Buchanon, stopped a threatening drive; the other, by Gary Johnson, was run back to the Minnesota two-yard line. Muncie opened the scoring two plays later. Kramer bounced back on the next two possessions with a pair of touchdown passes. Fouts responded with a 60-yard bomb to Dwight Scales, who dove to catch the ball inside the 10, before getting to his feet untouched and leaping over the goal-line. The Chargers threatened to take a lead into the interval, but Benirschke missed from 31 yards out, and it remained 14-14.

The Chargers' kicker took his next chance, making a 39-yarder in the 3rd quarter. Kramer and Fouts then exchanged quick, pass-oriented touchdown drives, with Terry LeCount and Joiner getting touchdown receptions. Kramer started the next drive with a 63-yard completion, and a Rick Danmeier field goal made it 24-24. The Chargers responded with a 15 play, 74-yard touchdown drive. Eight of those plays came inside the Minnesota 11: Fouts converted a 4th and inches with a sneak, leaving San Diego just short of the goal line; three runs into the line were then stuffed for no gain, before Muncie swept right and scored the go-ahead touchdown on 4th and goal.

Minnesota responded with a 4th down conversion of their own, but John Woodcock knocked the ball from Kramer's hands and recovered it himself at the Charger 32. San Diego then ran the clock down inside 3 minutes, before opting to go for it on 4th and 2 from the Viking 30. Muncie gained the first down, but fumbled, and Minnesota recovered. Given another chance, Kramer covered 72 yards in only 4 plays, the final 43 coming on a touchdown to LeCount.

With 1:51 on the clock, Danmeier missed the game-tying extra point attempt. However, he soon redeemed himself with an onside kick that skipped over the Charger line and was recovered by LeCount. Kramer and LeCount combined again for 18-yard, moving Minnesota into field goal range. Kramer fumbled the next snap, but Minnesota recovered - two plays later, Danmeier hit the winner from 38 yards out as time expired.

Muncie had 21 carries for 102 yards and 2 touchdowns. Fouts was 20 of 38 for 310 yards, 2 touchdowns and an interception, but was surpassed by Kramer, who became the first player to pass for 400 yards on the Chargers. He completed 27 of 43 for 444 yards, 4 touchdowns and 2 interceptions, while three of his receivers had 100-yard games.

Week 7: at Baltimore Colts 

Baltimore were on their way to setting an NFL record for most points conceded in a season. Unsurprisingly, the high-powered Charger offense put up a substantial score on them, though they had to overcome a bad start. Scales fumbled on the first San Diego possession, and Baltimore went 7-0 up midway through the 1st quarter. The Chargers responded with an 80-yard, 14-play touchdown drive. Fouts' 11-yard scramble on 3rd and 10 was one of three third down conversions, and Muncie ran in the tying score from the 3. Woodrow Lowe came up with an interception on the next play from scrimmage, setting up a shorter drive that Cappelletti capped with a 12-yard reception. Following a Baltimore punt, the Chargers made it three touchdown drives in a row, Joiner scoring from 23 yards out. A Mike Williams interception stopped a Colts' threat, and Benirschke added a field goal shortly before halftime. In a processional second half, Muncie and Cappelletti rushed for further touchdowns, and Clarence Williams added another one on a pass.

In a balanced display, San Diego had 298 yards and three touchdowns through the air, with 172 yards and three more touchdowns on the ground. Rookie defensive end Keith Ferguson had three of the Chargers' six sacks. The AFC West was shaping up to be a three-horse race, with San Diego, Denver and Kansas City all at 5-2.

Week 8: at Chicago Bears 

The 1-6 Bears took advantage of Dan Fouts' off day to shock San Diego. In the 1st quarter, Matt Suhey converted a 4th and 1 and later scored the opening touchdown. The Chargers almost tied the scores early in the 2nd quarter, but Joiner was stopped a yard short on 3rd and goal from the 18, and they settled for a field goal. Chicago's John Roveto also kicked a field goal, and it was 10-3 at half time.

San Diego's passing attack improved in the second half; Fouts found Joiner for 45 yards, but Benirschke missed a long field goal. Roveto appeared to have extended the Bears' lead on the next drive, but the Chargers were flagged for roughing the kicker, and the drive continued. After the San Diego defense were able to stop Walter Payton a yard short of the end zone, Roveto missed an 18-yard chip shot. The Chargers then drove 80 yards in 12 plays for the game-tying score, Fouts hitting Winslow to convert a 4th down three plays before Joiner scored from 22 yards out.

Chicago then produced a seven-minute drive, Suhey converting another 4th down before Payton restored the seven-point lead with 2:59 on the clock. San Diego quickly reached the Bear 39 in response, from where Fouts was twice nearly intercepted in the end zone. He went deep again on third down, where the ball was tipped in the air and caught by Chandler for his first Charger touchdown, 1:40 from time. The Bears punted on their final possession of regulation time, then Winslow was tackled at the Chicago 25 with no time on the clock.

The overtime coin toss went the Bears way, but San Diego twice forced them to punt. However, Fouts was intercepted both times in response. The second of these set Chicago up in Charger territory, and Roveto kicked the game-winner from 26 yards out, 9:30 into the extra period.

Fouts completed 3 of 18 in the first half, 10 of 19 in the second, and 0 of 6 in overtime. Joiner caught 5 passes for 124 yards and a touchdown. Chicago gained 195 yards on the ground, the most San Diego gave up all season.

Week 9: vs. Kansas City Chiefs  

Rolf Benirschke's late field goal lifted the Chargers to a crucial victory over the division-leading Chiefs. Gary Johnson got San Diego off to a good start with a fumble recovery after only two minutes. Muncie scored seven plays later, though the Chiefs levelled the scores on their next possession. In the second quarter, a Winslow fumble set Kansas City up in Charger territory, but John Woodcock had a fumble recovery of his own four plays later. The offense then covered 71 yards in only five plays Fouts finding Joiner for 29 yards and Eric Sievers for 31, before Muncie scored from the four. Benirschke missed the extra point, but was converted a 29-yard field goal with 30 seconds left in the half. Kansas City lost their third fumble on the ensuing kickoff, and the Chargers kicker added another three points as time expired: 19-7.

San Diego were unable to cross midfield on the first four possessions of the second half, turning the ball over twice as Kansas City chipped away at their deficit. A touchdown and two field goals made it 20-19 to the Chiefs with 6:32 to play in the 4th quarter. San Diego began their winning drive on their own 26. Fouts converted a pair of 3rd downs with completions to Joiner and Winslow, then faced a 4th and 9 at the Kansas City 47 on the first play after the two minute warning. Wes Chandler's 23-yard catch kept the drive going. After one further first down, Benirschke kicked the game-winner from 22 yards out, with 13 seconds remaining.

The result once again produced a three-way tie atop the AFC West, with all three pretenders now at 6-3.

Week 10: vs. Cincinnati Bengals 

Cincinnati capitalised on Charger turnovers to score a blowout win. A fumble by Joiner led to the first Bengal touchdown, and they led 10-0 going into the 2nd quarter. A 26-yard Chandler reception pulled San Diego within three, and Mike Williams thwarted the next threat with an end zone interception. In response, Cincinnati forced a three-and-out and scored touchdowns on consecutive possessions, either side of a Fouts fumble.

Trailing 24-7 with less than two minutes to play before halftime, San Diego moved the ball quickly, a 27-yard Brooks run swiftly followed by a 56-yard Scales reception, which moved the ball to the Cincinnati four-yard line. However, Fouts was then intercepted by Louis Breeden, who returned the ball 102 yards for the game-breaking touchdown. The Bengals converted two further turnovers into points in the second half, with Chandler's late 51-yard touchdown a mere consolation score.

Fouts was 20 of 40 for 352 yards, 2 touchdowns and 2 interceptions; he was sacked six times, after not getting sacked at all in the previous three games. Chandler caught 10 pass for 194 yards and 2 scores. Bengals safety Mike Fuller had spent the previous six seasons with the Chargers. He later revealed that San Diego had not changed their defensive signals since the 1980 season; Fuller was able to interpret them and give the Bengal offense an edge in this game.

Week 11: at Seattle Seahawks 

San Diego sustained a second consecutive blowout, this time on Monday Night. They began well, converting four 3rd downs on their opening possession, while going 78 yards in 15 plays - Muncie opened the scoring from a yard out. The game turned in the second quarter. After a Seahawks field goal, Brooks lost two fumbles in quick succession, leading to a pair of Seattle touchdowns and a 17-7 scoreline. Chuck Muncie then interrupted the flow, breaking a tackle at the line of scrimmage and bursting through the defense for a 73-yard touchdown run, the longest of his career. After another Seattle touchdown, Benirschke cut the halftime deficit to seven points with a 32-yard field goal.

The Chargers came close to tying the game on the opening possession of the second half, reaching the Seattle one yard line before Muncie was stuffed for no gain on both 3rd and 4th down. Seattle then moved to their 20, from where Dan Doornink took a pass in the flat 80 yards for the game-breaking touchdown. Muncie then fumbled, and Doornink scored again - the fifth Seattle touchdown in as many possessions. Chandler again scored a 4th quarter touchdown, but the Chargers were well beaten.

Muncie had 20 carries for 151 yards and two touchdowns; Kellen Winslow caught 7 passes for 106 yards. With five weeks to go, San Diego stood two games back from Denver and one behind Kansas City.

Week 12: at Oakland Raiders 

Record-setting performances by Dan Fouts and Kellen Winslow reenergised the Chargers' playoff push. They turned the ball over twice in the first half, and three times fell seven points behind. A 1-yard run by Muncie and 12-yard catch by Brooks tied the scores the first two times; after Oakland went 21-14 ahead, Winslow took over. His leaping catch in the end zone tied the scores with 3:06 to play before halftime. Brooks then ran a punt back 37 yards, and Winslow broke two tackles on the 29-yard touchdown that put San Diego ahead at the break.

Oakland's first two offensive plays of the second half saw Marc Wilson intercepted by Bob Horn and Pete Shaw, setting up the Charger offense with short fields. Both times, Fouts found Winslow with short touchdown passes, the latter coming 6:26 into the 3rd quarter - the pair had combined for four touchdowns in four possessions, across a span of just 9 minutes and 32 seconds of game time. When Fouts combined with Joiner for a score on the next Charger drive, the quarterback had thrown six touchdowns in as many possessions. The rout was completed in the 4th quarter when Muncie found a wide-open Winslow for a 3-yard touchdown.

Fouts completed 28 of 44 passes for 296 yards, 6 touchdowns and 1 interception - he still holds the Charger record for TD passes in a single game. Kellen Winslow had 13 catches for 144 yards and 5 touchdowns. He tied Chicago Cardinal Bob Shaw's 31-yard-old record for most TD receptions in a game - this record has subsequently been tied again, but not broken. On defense, Gary Johnson had four of the team's seven sacks. San Diego had been bolstered by a Denver loss earlier in the day - they were now one game back of both the Broncos and the Chiefs.

Week 13: vs. Denver Broncos 

Chuck Muncie became the second Charger to rush for four touchdowns in a game, and San Diego won a crucial divisional matchup with some ease. They went 74 yards in only 6 plays on the game's opening possession, a 29-yard Chandler reception and a 22-yarder from Winslow preceding Muncie's first score, covering 14 yards off right tackle. After Woodcock sacked Craig Morton to force a three-and-out, San Diego drove for another quick touchdown, Chandler's 44-yard catch setting up Muncie's short TD run.

Down 14-0 after barely seven minutes, Denver improved on the next few drives and pulled a touchdown back early in the 2nd quarter. However, a fumbled punt was recovered by Wyatt Henderson a few possessions later, and Muncie scored again only two plays later. Denver pulled a field goal, back, before Fouts and Muncie drove San Diego 64 yards to another score, with Muncie's 4th touchdown coming from 3 yards out, 19 seconds before halftime. Fouts later looped a touchdown pass to Eric Sievers on 4th and goal from the 1, and San Diego eased to victory.

Chandler caught 4 passes for 111 yards. Muncie had 18 carries for 75 yards and the 4 touchdowns. Craig Morton had devastated the Chargers earlier in the season, but threw no touchdowns in this game, and was picked off by Buchanon and Lowe. The Chiefs had lost earlier in the week, and this result left the three AFC West contenders tied once more, at 8-5. San Diego's favourable tiebreakers meant they would be assured of the division title with three more wins.

Week 14: vs. Buffalo Bills 

Buffalo avenged their recent playoff defeat, and left the Chargers needing help if they were to reach the playoffs again. San Diego began well, a 19-yard Bills punt setting them up at the Buffalo 46; Muncie's NFL-record-tying 19th rushing touchdown of the year came seven plays later. Later in the 1st quarter, they breached Bills territory again, but Mario Clark intercepted Fouts and returned the ball 53 yards to set up a Buffalo touchdown.

San Diego responded with a 10-play, 83-yard drive. They appeared to be settling for a field goal, but Buffalo jumped offside, and Fouts found Chandler for a 17-yard touchdown a play later. After Buffalo tied the game, Kellen Winslow scored comfortably the longest touchdown of his career, 55 seconds before halftime. He caught the ball in the left flat, broke a tackle and sprinted up the sideline - Buffalo defenders, possibly distracted by a official's flag (which was on the Bills) were slow to react, and Winslow completed a 67-yard touchdown reception, putting San Diego up 21-14 at halftime.

Fouts had passed for 260 yards in the first half alone, but found the going tougher thereafter. Buffalo scored touchdowns through Roosevelt Leaks and Joe Cribbs in the 3rd quarter, either side of a Benirschke field goal, and led 28-24. San Diego were poised to retake the lead on their next drive, but Winslow committed a hold on 1st and goal from the 2, and they had to settle for another field goal. They reached 4th and 2 at the Buffalo 35 on their next possession, but opted against sending Benirschke in for a 50+ yard attempt, and Muncie was stopped short on a sweep.

The Bills then missed a field goal, leaving San Diego 4:30 to drive for the winning points. A pair of 15-yard Fouts completions helped them into makeable field goal range, reaching 2nd and 9 from the Buffalo 32. Muncie then burst through the middle, but fumble at the 26; the Bills recovered and ran the clock out.

Fouts finished 28 of 42 for 343 yards, 2 touchdowns and an interception. Winslow caught 6 passes for 126 yards and a touchdown; Joiner caught 7 balls for 106 yards. Muncie carried 22 times for 119 yards and a touchdown. Overall, San Diego outgained Buffalo 482-318, but committed both the game's turnovers. At the same, Denver were beating Kansas City 16-13 to move into sole possession of the AFC West lead.

Week 15: at Tampa Bay Buccaneers 

San Diego maintained their playoff challenge into the final week of the regular season with a tense win over the Buccaneers. The Chargers struck first, with Fouts finding Sievers over the middle for 27 yards and a touchdown. Tampa Bay responded quickly: Theo Bell took in a short pass from Doug Williams and went 58 yards to tie the scores. In the 2nd quarter, Fouts completed all seven of his passes on a 90-yard drive that Cappelletti finished with an 8-yard run. The next Charger drive covered 82 yards, but was terminated by an end zone interception, and it was 14-7 at halftime.

Tampa Bay pulled three points back on the first possession of the third quarter. Later, Brooks lost a fumble in Buccaneers territory when he seemed on the verge of breaking into the open field, but Lowe recovered another fumble four plays later. The Chargers progressed rapidly to the Tampa one-yard line, from where Brooks scored to make it 21-10, with 11:52 to play. The game then turned rapidly in Tampa's favour. They drove 80 yards in only 6 plays, with James Wilder scoring from eight yards out (though the extra point was missed). Two plays later, Fouts was intercepted again, setting the Buccaneers up at the San Diego 23, from where Wilder took a sweep in for the go-ahead score. When Cappelletti fumbled four plays into the next drive, Tampa Bay had a 23-21 lead and the ball at the Charger 36, with 6:28 on the clock.

This time, San Diego won the ball back. Glen Edwards hit Williams' intended receiver, causing the ball to pop up for Lowe to intercept. Starting at his own 29, Fouts hit Winslow and Joiner for first downs, before the Chargers reached a 4th and 1 from the Tampa 34. They opted to go for it, and converted via Winslow's 3-yard catch. The tight end also converted a 3rd and 6 before Benirschke hit the game-winner from 29 yards out, with 45 seconds on the clock. Williams moved the ball to the Tampa 37, from where his final pass was intercepted by Edwards inside the ten as time expired.

Fouts was 33 of 49 for 351 yards, one touchdown and two interceptions. Chandler had 8 catches for 112 yards. Elsewhere, the Chiefs lost and were eliminated from the playoff race, but Denver beat the Seahawks to remain in first place. To qualify for the playoffs, San Diego would need either the Jets or Broncos to slip up, then win their final game against Oakland.

Week 16: vs. Oakland Raiders 

The day before this game, Denver were beaten 35-24 by the Chicago Bears. As a result, San Diego had the opportunity to win the AFC West on the final Monday night of the regular season for the third year in a row. Defeat would mean elimination.

Midway through the 1st quarter, Shaw and Buchanon forced a fumble that Edwards recovered at the Charger 32. Fouts completions on the next two plays moved the ball 40 yards, and Brooks finished off the quickfire scoring drive with a 28-yard run up the middle, breaking three tackles on his way into the end zone. Ahead 10-3 in the 2nd quarter, San Diego got a lucky break when Lester Hayes blocked a punt, only for Jim Laslavic to scoop up the ball and make first down yardage at the Charger 32. San Diego eventually had to punt again, but pinned Oakland inside their ten. Buchanon intercepted Marc Wilson on the ensuing drive, and Fouts found the leaping Joiner for a 29-yard touchdown two plays later. Wilson then drove Oakland to a 2nd and 10 from the Charger 11, with 7 seconds left before halftime. However, he spent too long while throwing an incompletion, and the Raiders came up empty-handed.

Oakland did pull the score back to 17-10 on the first drive of the second half, but didn't cross the Charger 40 the rest of the way. Benirschke kicked a pair of field goals to give the Chargers some breathing room, and they clinched the division with something to spare.

San Diego tried to get Muncie a record-breaking 20th touchdown in the final seconds, but he was stuffed on 4th and goal from the 2, and remained on 19. The Chargers didn't play in the league's regular season finale again until 2008.

Standings

Postseason

Game summaries

AFC Divisional Playoffs: Chargers at Dolphins

Rolf Benirschke's overtime field goal gave the Chargers victory in the Epic in Miami.

AFC Conference Championships: Chargers at Bengals

The AFC Championship Game was played on Jan. 10, 1982, in Cincinnati, Ohio. Quarterback Dan Fouts completed 15 out of 28 passes for 185 yards as the Chargers fell to the Bengals 27-7.

References

External links
1981 San Diego Chargers at pro-football-reference.com

San Diego Chargers
San Diego Chargers seasons
AFC West championship seasons
San Diego Chargers f